Tiger Lake is an Intel microprocessor.

Tiger Lake may also refer to the following places:

Tiger Lake (Carver County, Minnesota), U.S.
Tiger Lake (Redwood County, Minnesota), U.S.
Tiger Lake, Shuzheng Valley, Jiuzhaigou, China
Tiger Lake, or Pilikula Nisargadhama, Mangalore, India
Tiger Lake, a habitat at Africam Safari, Mexico

See also
Tiger (disambiguation)